Tetragonoderus bayeri is a species of beetle in the family Carabidae. It was described by Burgeon in 1936.

References

bayeri
Beetles described in 1936